Opaline may refer to:
 Opaline, a group of protists
 Opaline, an album by Dishwalla
 Opaline glass, decorative French glass
 Opaline silica: an amorphous or cryptocrystalline form of hydrated silica SiO2·nH2O (Opal)
 Opaline, a colour mutation of the budgerigar, Melopsittacus undulatus